Mactra glabrata is a species of bivalves belonging to the family Mactridae.

The species inhabits marine environments.

References

Mactridae